Highway 44 is part of land bridge project running across the Kra Isthmus. It starts at intersection with Phetkasem highway (Highway 4) in Krabi Province, running northeast, and ends at intersection with Highway 401 in Surat Thani Province. It roughly follows the route that a centuries-discussed Thai Canal might follow, if ever built.

Construction of Highway 44 began in the 1990s and was completed in 2003 at a cost of US$109.7 million.

Route details
Route 44 is part of land bridge project of Thailand's southern seaboard. However, the other parts of project have not yet built. Route 44 was slated to connect seaports on both the western and eastern coasts of Thailand. However, as the locations of seaports have not yet been finalized, only the central portion of Route 44 has been constructed. The roughly 50 km missing portions will be built when the location of the seaports has been finalized.

Route 44 is unique in that it was designed to accompany other forms of transportation. Both directions of the road were built 150 metres apart. The large centre median will be used for  railroad tracks and a pipeline. However, the project is currently stalled and nothing has been built but the roadways, leaving the centre of the highway empty. There are also no crossing intersections, the only way to cross the highway is to use the U-turns or one of the few bridges.

In Krabi Province, it starts at Amphoe Ao Luek and passes through Plai Phraya. It enters Surat Thani Province at Amphoe Phrasaeng and passes through Amphoe Khian Sa, Amphoe Ban Na Doem, Amphoe Mueang Surat Thani and ends at Amphoe Kanchanadit.

Total length is about 190 km. About 40 km is in Krabi Province and 150 km in Surat Thani Province. Route 44 is asphalt for entire length and has four lanes total, two lanes in each direction with a 150-metre-wide ditch to separate the roadways.

List of intersections

Krabi Province
(Start) Route 4 (northwestward to Phang Nga Province, southeastward to Amphoe Mueang Krabi)
Route 4035 (westward to Amphoe Plai Phraya, eastward to Amphoe Phrasaeng)
Surat Thani Province
Route 4113 (northward to Amphoe Phunphin, southward to Amphoe Phrasaeng)
Route 41 (northward to Amphoe Phunphin, southward to Amphoe Ban Na Doem (Interchange*))
Route 4009 (northward to Amphoe Mueang Surat Thani, southward to Amphoe Ban Na San)
(end) Route 401 (westward to Amphoe Kanchanadit, eastward to Nakhon Si Thammarat Province)

References 

National highways in Thailand